Jerome (c.347–420) was a priest, confessor, theologian and historian from Dalmatia.

Jerome may also refer to:

People

Given name
 Jerome (given name), a masculine name of Greek origin, with a list of people so named
 Saint Jerome (disambiguation), several saints and other topics named for them

Surname
 Cameron Jerome (born 1986), English footballer
 Chauncey Jerome (1793–1868), American clockmaker and politician
 David Jerome (1829–1896), governor of Michigan
 Harry Jerome (1940–1982), Canadian track and field runner
 James Jerome (1933–2005), Canadian judge and politician
 Jennie Jerome, Lady Randolph Churchill (1854–1921), mother of UK Prime Minister Winston Churchill
 Jerome K. Jerome (1859–1927), British author
 Jerry Jerome (boxer) (1874–1943), Australian boxer
 Jerry Jerome (saxophonist) (1912–2001), American musician
 Leonard Jerome (1817–1891), American financier
 Randolph Jerome (born 1978), Guyanese soccer player
 Ty Jerome (born 1997), American basketball player
 William Jerome (1865–1932), American songwriter
 William Travers Jerome (1859–1934), New York lawyer

Places

United States 
Jerome, Arizona
Jerome Historic District, a historic copper mining district
Jerome Grand Hotel, a historic hotel
Jerome State Historic Park
Jerome, Arkansas, a town in Drew County
The Jerome War Relocation Center, a Japanese American internment camp
Jerome, Florida, an unincorporated community in Collier County
Jerome County, Idaho
Jerome, Idaho, a city in Jerome County
Jerome, Illinois, a village in Sangamon County
Jerome, Indiana, an unincorporated community in Howard County
Jerome, Iowa, an unincorporated community in Appanoose County
Jerome, Michigan, an unincorporated community in Hillsdale County
Jerome Township, Michigan, a civil township in Midland County
Jerome, Missouri, an unincorporated community in Phelps County
Jerome Township, Union County, Ohio
Jerome, Ohio, an unincorporated community in Union County
Jerome, Pennsylvania, a census-designated place in Somerset County
Jerome, West Virginia, an uninhabited community in Morgan County
Jerome Avenue, a thoroughfare in the Bronx, New York
Jerome Street Bridge in McKeesport, Pennsylvania

Canada 
Lac-Jérôme, Quebec, an unorganized territory in the Côte-Nord region

Arts
 Jerome (Family Guy), a character in the animated comedy series
 "Jerome", a song by Lykke Li from Wounded Rhymes, 2011
 "Jerome", a song by Zella Day from Kicker, 2015
 "Jerome", a song by Atmosphere from Mi Vida Local, 2018
 "Jerome", a song by Lizzo from Cuz I Love You, 2019

Other uses
1414 Jérôme, a main belt asteroid
Dublin Jerome High School, a public high school in Dublin, Ohio, USA
Jerome Biblical Commentary, a 1968 two-volume book of Biblical scholarship and commentary
Jerome High School (Jerome, Idaho), an American public secondary school
Jerome Park Racetrack, a thoroughbred horse racing facility in New York
Jerome Park Reservoir, part of the metropolitan New York City water supply system
Pseudo-Jerome, the name given to several authors misidentified as, or claiming to be, Saint Jerome

See also
Jean Jérôme (disambiguation)
Jérôme Bonaparte (disambiguation)
Gerome (disambiguation)
Geronimus (disambiguation)
Geronimo (disambiguation)
Girolamo
Hieronymus (disambiguation)
Jeremy (disambiguation)
Jeroen (disambiguation)
Jerónimo (disambiguation)
Jerry (given name)